The leichter gepanzerter Munitionstransportwagen (Sd. Kfz. 252) was a light armoured ammunition carrier used by Nazi Germany during World War II as early as the Battle of France in June 1940.

History
The Sd. Kfz. 252 was based on the Sd.Kfz. 250 half-track and used the same chassis. Initially built by the Demag and Wegmann firms from June through to December 1940, production shifted to Deutsche Werke from January to September 1941. 413 vehicles were manufactured, all of which were issued as ammunition resupply vehicles to Sturmartillerie batteries and saw operation on both European fronts.

As additional load capacity was required, the Sonder-Anhänger (Sd. Ah.) für Munition (7,5 cm) (Sd. Ah. 32/1) was developed as an ammunition transport trailer for towing behind the Sd. Kfz. 252. This trailer carried an additional 36 rounds of 75mm ammunition.

During the Battle of France, Sd.Kfz. 252s were used by Sturmartillerie Batteries 640 and 659. Due to production delays with the new Sd. Kfz. 252, Sturmartillerie Batteries 660 and 665 went into battle using “turretless” Panzerkampfwagen I munitions carriers.

On the Eastern front, units using the Sd. Kfz. 252 included the Sturmgeschütz-Abteilung 184, 190, 191, and 210.

The Sd.Kfz.252 was eventually replaced by the Sd.Kfz.250/6.

Armour breakdown

Miscellaneous facts
 Used the FuG15 or the FuG16 radio system
 Transmission had 7 forward and 3 reverse gears
 Was armed with a 7.92 MG34
 Six-cylinder, water-cooled, 3000 RPM, engine

Gallery

References

Sources
World War 2 Vehicles
Axis History Forum

World War II armoured fighting vehicles of Germany
World War II half-tracks
Half-tracks of Germany
Military vehicles introduced from 1940 to 1944